The Assistant Vice Chief of Staff of the United States Air Force was a position in the United States Air Force held by a lieutenant general who also served as the director of the Air Staff. The holder of the position oversees the administration and organization of the Air Staff, which develops policies, plans and programs; establishes requirements; and provides resources to support the Air Force's mission. He also serves as Deputy Chairman of the Air Force Council, and is the Air Force accreditation official for the international Corps of Air Attachés.

List of Assistant Vice Chiefs of Staff of the United States Air Force 
The following officers served as Assistant Vice Chief of Staff of the United States Air Force:

Director of Staff of the Air Force 
Lt Gen Stayce Harris became the last to hold the office, but the position of Director of Staff remained.

References 

United States Air Force
Lieutenant generals